Patigaun is a village development committee in Morang District in the Kosi Zone of south-eastern Nepal. At the time of the 1991 Nepal census it had a population of 2104 people living in 367 individual households.

References

Kerabari Rural Municipality